The German name of Austria, derives from the Old High German word  "eastern realm", recorded in the so-called  Document of 996, applied to the Margraviate of Austria, a march, or borderland, of the Duchy of Bavaria created in 976. 
The name is seemingly comparable to Austrasia, the early middle age term for the "eastern lands" of Francia, as known from the written records.

The Old High German name parallels the Middle Latin name  ("eastern borderland"), alternatively called . The shorter Latinized name  is first recorded in the 12th century. It has occasionally led to confusion, because, while it renders the Germanic word for "east" it is reminiscent of the native Latin term for "south", .

In the 12th century, the Margraviate was elevated to the status of duchy, in 1453 to archduchy and from 1804 claiming imperial status, all the time retaining both the name  and the Latin name .

, a translation of  into Standard German, was used officially from 1938, when the country was incorporated into the German Reich, until 1945.

The contemporary state was created in 1955, with the Austrian State Treaty, and is officially called the Republic of Austria.

German name
 is derived from Old High German . The term probably originates as a vernacular translation of the Latin name  (eastern borderland). The  is related to Old High German  (eastern), but its exact derivation is unclear. Old High German rihhi had the meaning of "realm, domain".

The , also called the Bavarian Eastern March (Ostmark) and the March of Austria, was a prefecture of the Duchy of Bavaria. It was assigned to the Babenberg family in 976. The variant  is known from a single usage dated 996. The variation  is first recorded in 998.  appears on a deed granted by Emperor Henry IV and dated 1058.

Friedrich Heer, a 20th-century Austrian historian, stated in his book  (The Struggle Over Austrian Identity), that the Germanic form  was not a translation of the Latin word, but both resulted from a much older term originating in the Celtic languages of ancient Austria: more than 2,500 years ago, the major part of the actual country was called  by the Celtic Hallstatt culture of the land; according to Heer,  or  meant "east" or "easterns", whereas  is related to the modern German , meaning "realm". The Celtic name was eventually Latinised to  after the Romans conquered the area that encloses most of modern-day Austria, in around 15 BC.  later became a Roman province in the mid 1st century AD. Heer's hypothesis is not accepted by linguists.

An alternative theory, proposed by the Austrian Slavistics professor Otto Kronsteiner, suggests that the term  is taken from a Slavic toponym  meaning 'pointed hill', taking its popular meaning of 'Eastern realm' at a much later time. This theory was rejected as untenable by Austrian linguist Heinz-Dieter Pohl.

Another remoter possibility is that the name comes from the Ostrogoths, who had a kingdom in what is now Austria and northern Italy.

Ostarrîchi document

The document was issued by Emperor Otto III on November 1, 996 in Bruchsal to Gottschalk von Hagenau, Bishop of Freising.

The document concerns a donation of the "territory which is known in the vernacular as ", specified as the region of Neuhofen an der Ybbs. The emperor donated this land to the abbey of Freising as a fief. The lands and some other communities in the vicinity, which the abbey acquired later, were held until 1803, when they were incorporated into Austria.

Latin name
The name  is a latinization of German  (that is, the spelling of the name Austria approximates, for the benefit of Latin speakers, the sound of the German name ). This has led to much confusion as German  is "east", but Latin  is "south". That is why the name is similar to Australia, which is derived from the Latin  ("southern land").

In English usage, "Austria" is attested since the early 17th century.

Other languages
Finnish  is also derived from the German name:  means "east" and  "state". "Austria" or a phonetic derivative (such as ) was adopted in most other languages, including Hungarian, Italian, Spanish, Portuguese, Maltese, Ukrainian, Russian, Serbo-Croatian, Polish, Slovene, Greek, Estonian, Turkish, and Albanian. French is one of the exceptions within the Romance group in adapting the German name, . Catalan also did the same, though the forms are no longer in use.

The Czech and Slovak languages have a peculiar name for Austria. Czech  and Slovak  neither derived from German  nor from Latin .

Another possible explanation of Czech  and Slovak : The predecessor of Austria and Slovenia was Slovene principality Carantania. The central part of Carantania (the territory of present-day southern Austria and north-eastern Slovenia) is named in Slovenian  (or in the old version ), in Slovak , in German  and in English Carinthia. The Old High German name of Austria appeared in written document more than three hundred years later than the name Carantania, while the shorter Latin name  was first mentioned only in 12th century. Therefore is it reasonably to assume that the present-day Czech and Slovak name for Austria developed from the original Slavic name for Carantania since in early middle ages and also later the ancestor of the present-day Slovaks and Slovenes were not divided by the wedge of Germanic or Germanized population. 

The Arabic appellation of Austria was first used during the Crusades and was borrowed from the Slavic name for "Germans",  whence Russian , Polish , Croatian and Bosnian , Serbian , Slovene , Czech has , Slovak , etc.. The Arabic name could have also appeared in Arabic Andalusia and then was spread across much of the Islamic world.

In Persian, Austria was called  (the same name as Arabic) and when the Turks came to settle in Anatolia later in the Ottoman Empire era, they used the Arabic name of Austria as well and they called the country Nemçe. Currently, the name , derived from the French pronunciation, is used.

See also
 History of Austria (for a broader historical perspective)
 Austrasia

Notes

References

External links

AEIOU Encyclopedia
Historical information in German
 
 Die Ostarrichi-Urkunde, 
 Wikisource: Text of the document of 996 (Latin)
 Heinz Dieter Pohl: Pohl: Ostarrîchi 996–1996 Tausend Jahre Name Österreich

Medieval Austria
Austria